Lynn is a former settlement in Alameda County, California. It was located northeast of Brooklyn.  In 1870, Lynn and Brooklyn incorporated as Brooklyn In 1872, voters approved the annexation by Oakland.  Lynn hosted a large shoe and boot factory, the "Lynn Boot and Shoe Manufacturing Company" which incorporated in 1869 and was named after Lynn, Massachusetts which also had a large footwear industry.

References

Neighborhoods in Oakland, California
1870 disestablishments in California